Sir William Peere Williams, 2nd Baronet, MP (c. 1730 – 27 April 1761) was an English politician in Great Britain.

He was born in Clapton, Northamptonshire, England, to Sir Hutchins Williams, 1st Baronet of Clapton, and Anne Hutchins.
 
He was Member of Parliament for New Shoreham from 1758 until his death in 1761.

An officer in the British Army who served in the Seven Years' War, Williams was killed at Butalot in the Capture of Belle Île in France.

Notes

References 
Burke, John, and Bernard Burke. A Genealogical and Heraldic History of the Extinct and Dormant Baronetcies of England, Ireland and Scotland. London: J.R. Smith, 1844.

External links 
Bellisle 1761

1730 births
1761 deaths
Williams, Sir William Peere, 2nd Barone
Members of the Parliament of Great Britain for English constituencies
British MPs 1754–1761
British Army officers
British military personnel killed in the Seven Years' War
British Army personnel of the Seven Years' War